The San Miguel Province is one of the thirteen provinces in the Cajamarca Region of Peru. It was created by Law No. 15152 on September 29, 1964 by president Fernando Belaunde Terry. As a result, there is a great diversity of climates ranging from hot and dry at lower altitudes to cold and rainy at higher levels. Herding is an important economic activity thanks to the existence of extensive pastures. Its main product is cow's milk which is either sold outside the province or transformed into dairy products such as cheese. There are several gold mines in production in the higher regions of the province. There's also an important handicraft industry mainly devoted to textiles made out of cotton or wool.

Archaeology
The oldest known irrigation canals in the Americas are located in the Nanchoc District of San Miguel Province. The canals in the Zaña Valley have been radiocarbon dated to 3400 BCE, and possibly date to 4700 BCE.

Political division

The province is divided into thirteen districts.
 San Miguel (San Miguel de Pallaques)
 Bolívar (Bolívar)
 Calquis (Calquis)
 Catilluc (Catilluc)
 El Prado (El Prado)
 La Florida (La Florida)
 Llapa (Llapa)
 Nanchoc (Nanchoc)
 Niepos (Niepos)
 San Gregorio (San Gregorio)
 San Silvestre de Cochan (San Silvestre de Cochan)
 Tongod (Tongod)
 Unión Agua Blanca (Agua Blanca)

See also 
 Wayra Punku

Notes

Provinces of the Cajamarca Region